Route 340 is a collector road in the Canadian province of Nova Scotia.

It is located in the western part of the province and connects Hebron at Trunk 1 with Weymouth at Trunk 1.

Communities
 Hebron
 Deerfield
 Weaver Settlement
 Carleton
 Richfield
 Pleasant Valley
 Forest Glen
 Corberrie
 Weymouth

History

Before 1970, Route 340 was called Trunk Route 40.

See also
List of Nova Scotia provincial highways

References

Nova Scotia provincial highways
Roads in Yarmouth County
Roads in Digby County, Nova Scotia